Toronto Solid Waste Management is the municipal service that handles the transfer and disposal of garbage as well as the processing and sale of recyclable materials collected through the blue box program in Toronto, Ontario, Canada. It also coordinates programs to help residents and business reduce their production of waste.

Issues

1990s End of Local Landfills

As the city's last remaining landfill site, Keele Valley, neared capacity during the 1990s, it was found that no other municipality in Southern Ontario was willing to accept the garbage, but there was also no political support for a change to incineration. A deal was eventually made to ship Toronto's garbage to the Adams Mine, an abandoned open pit mine in Northern Ontario, once the Keele Valley site closed. But objections turned to serious controversy as the time neared, and eventually the agreement was cancelled.

2000–2006 Shipping Waste to US
By the time the Keele Valley site closed at the end of 2002, the city had made a deal that its garbage would be shipped by truck to a site in Michigan, Carleton Farms Landfill.

2006–2010 End of US waste shipment, search for new landfill and diversion targets

Concerns with the international border, and opposition from residents in Michigan prompted the need to look for alternate sites or expand the city's recycling programs.  Toronto's contract with Michigan lasts until 2008, and includes an option to expand to 2010, but the city is actively seeking options to close the contract sooner. Even the current contract could be in jeopardy following a vote in February 2006 by the Michigan House of Representatives to ban out-of-state garbage from being shipped to the state from Ontario and other U.S. states, but this requires approval by the US federal government before it can be enforced by Michigan. In May 2006, Carelton Farms, the garbage dump in Michigan that is under contract with the city of Toronto announced it would not be accepting waste sludge as of August 1, 2006, but would continue to receive household waste.

In September 2006, Toronto City council agreed to purchase the privately owned Green Lane landfill site near London, Ontario. The contract to ship household garbage to Michigan ended in 2010, at which time the Green Lane landfill began to be used. Jane Pitfield who ran (and lost) against Mayor Miller in the November 2006 election advocated incineration as an alternative method of disposing of waste. She was opposed by many Toronto environmental groups but supported by others who point out that the technology has improved and incineration is now less polluting.

Even with 60% diversion through the green bin and recycling programs, residual waste from the Greater Toronto Area would amass 2,200 tonnes (2,425 tons) a day or 800,000 tonnes (882,000 tons) a year.

In 2005, Toronto switched from a "blue box" (plastic and metal) and "grey box" (paper) program to a unified recycling system. The city also introduced in 2005 a green bin program to recover compostable materials. However, the green bin program has come under criticism by watch groups due to its cost, which is three times per tonne more to operate than currently shipping to Michigan.

There has long been heavy opposition from many Torontonians to waste incineration due to the perceived toxic emissions that result. However, a recent poll conducted in November 2006 shows that a majority of its citizens would now consider incineration as an alternative, which the former mayor Miller opposed. There is currently an incinerator operating in Brampton in adjacent Peel Region, in operation since 1992, which meets the environment ministry's emission guidelines as well as producing power to serve around 5,000 homes.

In June 2006, suburban York Region and Durham Region announced they were jointly teaming up to procure an incineration site to be built by 2011 that will potentially power up to 200,000 homes but this does not include the city of Toronto.

In September 2006, city council approved an agreement to ship Toronto garbage to the Green Lane Waste Facility near St. Thomas, Ontario. Councillors opposed to the agreement have accused Mayor Miller of pushing through a secretive deal and there has also been strong reaction from residents and MPs from the London-St. Thomas area.

2011–present Contracting Out Waste Collection

Under Mayor Rob Ford, the City began to look at ways to cut cost on waste management. One solution was for contracting out waste collection services to private contractors.

With the exception of Etobicoke, the rest of Toronto's waste services employees were civic staff.  In Etobicoke services are contracted out to Turtle Island Recycling Company of Toronto since 2008.  Transport of waste from transfer stations to landfills are contracted out to Republic Services Canada Incorporated of Dundas, Ontario and Wilson Logistics Incorporated of Toronto, Ontario.

Beginning in the mid-2012, a new contractor began residential pickup services. GFL Environmental from Pickering, Ontario began to service the city west of Yonge Street and east of Etobicoke. In October 2011, the city nor contractors have indicated if current waste staff will be hired back to work on the two contracts, but in December GFL acquired Turtle Island Recycling and took over the remaining term of the former contract from December 2011 and will be replaced by Miller Waste Systems beginning in 2015.

Landfills

There are 160 former dumps located within the former city of Toronto and former Metro Toronto area but most have been redeveloped in the 20th Century:

 Harper's Dump - located in what is Greenwood Subway Yard and used during the 1930s
 Riverdale Park - used for a single year in 1960

By the later 20th Century Toronto and previously Metro Toronto have used a number of sites mostly close to the city to handle solid waste collected:

 Keele Valley Landfill - former landfill owned and used by Metro Toronto from 1983 (Toronto since 1998 to 2002) to deal with waste from all municipalities that now make up Toronto. Now sits idle until 2028 when re-development can commence.
 Britannia Landfill - former landfill in Mississauga, Ontario took Metro Toronto and Toronto waste. Closed in 2002.
 Beare Road Landfill - former Metro Toronto landfill from 1967 to 1983 located in Scarborough.
 Brock Road Landfills - former landfill used by Metro Toronto from 1975 to 1990s in neighbouring communities of Pickering and Ajax.

By the late 1980s and 1990s the locate site were near capacity forcing authorities to look beyond for landfill to take their waste:

 Adams Mine - former iron ore pit mine that was slated to take Toronto waste in the 1990s, but rejected by then Metro Toronto council.
 Green Lane landfill - landfill near London, Ontario and purchased by Toronto in 2006 to handle waste from the city.
 Carleton Farms Landfill - landfill in Wayne County, Michigan that accepted Toronto's garbage from 2002 to 2006.

See also

 Nine Dragons Paper Holdings Limited - paper recycler in China that has accepted recycled paper collected from Toronto, Ontario.
 Garbology
 Historical digging
 Dump digging
 Landfills in the United States

References

Landfills in Canada
Municipal government of Toronto